Maria ("Ria") Van Landeghem (born 19 September 1957 in Sint-Niklaas, East Flanders) is a senior grand masters level female long-distance runner from Belgium, who competed in road race and marathons. She represented her native country at the 1984 Summer Olympics, finishing in 21st place in the women's marathon.

Van Landeghem is a one-time winner (1984) of the Stockholm Marathon. Her personal best is 2:28:11, winning the Twin Cities Marathon in 1988. She won the Boilermaker 15K Race that year.

In 2019, she set the World Masters Athletics record for 60-64 women for the marathon, timing a 3:02:05 (gantry to gantry, not gun time) to defeat Joan Benoit Samuelson, who started ahead and had beaten van Landeghem by seven seconds on the gun time, but was 16 seconds slower on the net time (3:02:21), at the BMW Berlin Marathon.

Achievements

References

1957 births
Living people
Belgian female long-distance runners
Athletes (track and field) at the 1984 Summer Olympics
Olympic athletes of Belgium
Sportspeople from Sint-Niklaas